Maurice Satineau (born 18 September 1891 in Baie Mahault, Guadeloupe; died 13 September 1960 in Paris) was a politician from Guadeloupe who served in the French Council of the Republic (Senate) from 1948-1958 and the French Chamber of Deputies from 1936 to 1942 (the Chamber was not summoned between 1940 and 1942) .

References 
page on the French Senate website

page on the French National Assembly website
More details in the French Version

1891 births
1960 deaths
People from Baie-Mahault
Guadeloupean politicians
Socialist Republican Union politicians
Members of the 16th Chamber of Deputies of the French Third Republic
French Senators of the Fourth Republic
Senators of Guadeloupe
Black French politicians